"Candle (Sick and Tired)" is the debut single recorded by the American band the White Tie Affair, released in 2008. It is from their only album, Walk This Way. The video for the single has a guest appearance by the Glee star, Heather Morris, as well as cameos from the lonelygirl15 star Jessica Rose and the Good Charlotte guitarist Benji Madden.

Track listing
iTunes - Remixes
 "Candle (Sick and Tired)" [Johnny Vicious Club Mix] - 8:08
 "Candle (Sick and Tired)" [Johnny Vicious Warehouse Vocal Mix] - 7:50
 "Candle (Sick and Tired)" [Johnny Vicious Warehouse Dub] - 6:49
 "Candle (Sick and Tired)" [Johnny Vicious Radio Edit] - 4:09
 "Candle (Sick and Tired)" [Razor N Guido Club Mix] - 7:29	
 "Candle (Sick and Tired)" [Razor N Guido Dub] - 7:39
 "Candle (Sick and Tired)" [Razor N Guido Radio Edit] - 3:47

Chart positions
The song made entered The Billboard Hot 100 at number 93, and peaked at number 57. It peaked at number 3 on the Billboard Hot Dance Club Play.

References

2008 songs
2008 debut singles
The White Tie Affair songs
Epic Records singles
Songs written by Scott Cutler
Songs written by Anne Preven